Norway have participated 12 times at the UEFA Women's Championship: They have won two UEFA Women's Championships (1987, 1993). Norways largest defeat at the  UEFA Women's Championship was 8-0.

UEFA Women's Championship 

*Draws include knockout matches decided on penalty kicks.

References 

 
Euro
Countries at the UEFA Women's Championship